The Symphony No. 41 in C major, Hoboken I/41, is a festive symphony by Joseph Haydn. The symphony was composed by 1769. It is scored for flute, two oboes, bassoon, two horns, two trumpets, timpani and strings.

The work is in four movements:

Allegro con spirito, 
Un poco andante in F major, 
Menuet & Trio, 
Presto, 

The flute appears only in the slow movement where it is featured prominently in several elegant solo passages. This is not unusual for Haydn's symphonies.  Using that type of solo usually would seem out of place in the classical symphony. He felt the complete freedom to innovate as he wished, as he was composing in the relatively isolated palace of Esterhaza.

References

Symphony 041
Compositions in C major
1769 compositions